The following is a list of the tallest buildings within the urban area of Stockholm, Sweden. An asterisk (*) indicates that the building is still under construction but has been topped out.

Tallest under construction or proposed

See also
 List of tallest buildings in Sweden
List of tallest buildings in the European Union

References 

Buildings and structures in Stockholm